Introducing... Rubén González is the second studio album by Cuban pianist Rubén González. It was recorded at EGREM studios in Havana, Cuba, during April 1996, as the last of the sessions that also yielded the albums A Toda Cuba le Gusta and Buena Vista Social Club. It was released on September 16, 1997, through World Circuit, thus becoming González's international debut. The album reached number seventeen on Billboard Top Latin Albums. In 2014 it was awarded a diamond certification from the Independent Music Companies Association, which indicated sales of at least 200,000 copies throughout Europe.

Recording
This album was made at the end of World Circuit's three week recording session at EGREM Studios in Havana that had started in March 1996. Every morning during the recording of A Toda Cuba le Gusta (produced by Juan de Marcos González), Rubén would wait for the studio's doors to open and would rush to the piano and play. The same would happen throughout the recording of Buena Vista Social Club (produced by Ry Cooder). After these two albums were completed, Rubén was still at the piano.

Not only was he asked to stay, but he was invited to record his own album, to choose his own repertoire and to play for as long as he wanted. With virtually no rehearsals, the band played this collection of classic Cuban tunes, as a series of descargas (Cuban jam sessions).

Track listing
 "La engañadora" (Enrique Jorrín) – 2:32
 "Cumbanchero" (Rafael Hernández) – 4:35
 "Tres lindas cubanas" (Guillermo Castillo) – 5:22
 "Melodía del río" (Rubén González) – 4:42
 "Mandinga" (Guillermo Rodríguez Fiffe) – 8:28
 "Siboney" (Ernesto Lecuona) – 2:32
 "Almendra" (Abelardo Valdés) – 9:52
 "Tumbao" (Rubén González) – 5:11
 "Como siento yo" (Rubén González) – 2:40

Personnel

Musicians
Rubén González – piano
Orlando "Cachaíto" López – bass
Manuel "Guajiro" Mirabal – trumpet
Manuel "Puntillita" Licea – vocals, background vocals
Richard Egües – flute
Roberto García – congas, güiro, cowbell
Carlos González – congas
Carlos Puisseaux – güiro
José Antonio "Maceo" Rodríguez – background vocals
Alberto Valdés – maracas
Amadito Valdés – timbales

Production
Juan de Marcos González – arranger, conductor, background vocals
Nick Gold – producer
Jerry Boys  – engineer, mixing
Duncan Cowell – mastering
Lucy Durán – photography, interviewer
Cristina Piza – photography
Kathryn Samson – cover design, sleeve design
Nigel Williamson – liner notes

Charts

Certifications and sales

References

1997 albums
Rubén González (pianist) albums
Spanish-language albums
Nonesuch Records albums
World Circuit (record label) albums